North II is an electoral district in Lebanon, as per the 2017 vote law. The district elects 11 members of the Lebanese National Assembly - 8 Sunni, 1 Alawite, 1 Greek Orthodox and 1 Maronite. The constituency contains three 'minor districts', Tripoli (corresponding to Tripoli District), Miniyeh and Danniyeh (the latter two corresponding to the Miniyeh-Danniyeh District). The Tripoli 'minor district' elects 5 Sunnis, 1 Alawite, 1 Greek Orthodox and 1 Maronite parliamentarian, the Miniyeh 'minor district' elects 1 Sunni and the Danniyeh 'minor district' elects 2 Sunni parliamentarians.

Under the previous electoral law, Tripoli and Miniyeh-Danniyeh constituted two different constituencies.

Electorate
The electorate is predominately Sunni (82.91%), with significant minorities of Greek Orthodox (6.24%), Alawites (6.04%) and Maronites (3.5%). 0.51% of the electorate are Armenian Orthodox, 0.32% Armenian Catholics and 0.59% belong to other Christian communities.

Below data from 2017;

2018 election

With the new election law in place, the heavyweights of Tripoli politics went in different directions. Justifying the decision to head to the polls alone, the Future Movement general secretary Ahmed Hariri stated that "[w]e will form our own list because we came to understand that a lot of people had taken advantage of us...". In Dennieh, the 28-year old Sami Fatfat overtook his father Ahmad Fatfat's mantle as the Future Movement candidate. Mohammad Safadi opted to stay out of the electoral race, calling for support to the Future list. Safadi announced his decision at a press conference at the Safadi Cultural Center.

All in all, 8 lists were registered in the second northern electoral district; the "Determination" list of former Prime Minister Najib Mikati, the Future Movement list, a list led by Ashraf Rifi, the "National Dignity" list (alliance between Faisal Karami and Jihad Samad, with participation of Al-Ahbash and Marada Movement), the "People's Decision" list (alliance between Free Patriotic Movement and Kamal Kheir, joined by independents), the "Kulluna Watani" (We are all National) list (Sabaa Party, Movement of Citizens in the State, Socialist Arab Lebanon Vanguard Party, Resistance Movement and independents), the "Independent Decision" list (alliance between al-Jamaa al-Islamiah, ex-parliamentarian Mesbah Ahdab and independents) and the "Independent Civil Society" list (independents).

Mikati launched his "Determination" list at an electoral meeting at the Quality Inn Hotel in Tripoli on March 18, 2018. Amongst his candidates were former minister Jean Obeid and Nicolas Nahas and incumbent Future parliamentarian Kazim Kheir. Kheir was denied the Minnieh spot on the Future Movement list, a move that pushed him to join the Mikati list instead.

Result by lists

Result by candidate

References

Electoral districts of Lebanon